Dāvis is a Latvian masculine given name and may refer to:
Dāvis Bertāns (born 1992), Latvian basketball player
Dāvis Ikaunieks (born 1994), Latvian footballer
Dāvis Indrāns (born 1995), Latvian footballer

References

Latvian masculine given names